A Killer Among Us is a split EP from Swedish bands The Hives and The Pricks, released in 1998 on the Hard-On Records label.

Track listing

The Hives 
"Punkrock City Morning"
"Gninrom Ytic Kcorknup"
"Numbers" (The Adicts)

The Pricks 
"Butthole City"
"Beaty Expert"
"I Don't Need Your School"

References 

The Hives albums
1998 EPs
Split EPs